The following outline is provided as an overview of and topical guide to war:

War – organised and often prolonged armed conflict that is carried out by states or non-state actors – is characterised by extreme violence, social disruption, and economic destruction. War should be understood as an actual, intentional and widespread armed conflict between political communities, and therefore is defined as a form of political violence or intervention.

Warfare refers to the common activities and characteristics of types of war, or of wars in general.

Types of war

Types of warfare 
 Asymmetric warfare
 Expeditionary warfare
 Expeditionary maneuver warfare

Warfare by objective 
 Defensive warfare
 Offensive warfare

Warfare by strategic doctrine

Warfare by terrain

Warfare by equipment or weapon type

Warfare by era

Warfare by stages

Other 
 Champion warfare
 Underwater warfare

History of war

Warfare by era 
See: Warfare by era

Wars

Wars by death toll
 List of wars by death toll

Wars by date

Wars by region

Wars by type of conflict

Battles 
 Lists of battles
 List of battles by casualties
 List of orders of battle
 List of sieges

Military theory 
 Military theory
 Philosophy of war
 Principles of war
 War cycles

Military organization

Operational level of war 

 Blitzkrieg
 Soviet deep battle
 Maneuver warfare
 Operational manoeuvre group

Military operations 
 List of military operations
 Military operation plan
 Military operations other than war

Types of military operations
Types of military operations, by scope:
 Theater – operation over a large, often continental area of operation and represents a strategic national commitment to the conflict such as Operation Barbarossa, with general goals that encompass areas of consideration outside of the military such as the economic and political impacts.
 Campaign – subset of the theatre operation, or a more limited geographic and operational strategic commitment such as Battle of Britain, and need not represent total national commitment to a conflict, or have broader goals outside of the military impacts.
 Battle – subset of a campaign that will have specific military goals and geographic objectives, as well as clearly defined use of forces such as the Battle of Gallipoli, which operationally was a combined arms operation originally known as the "Dardanelles landings" as part of the Dardanelles Campaign, where about 480,000 Allied troops took part.
 Engagement – tactical combat event of contest for specific area or objective by actions of distinct units. For example, the Battle of Kursk, also known from its German designation as Operation Citadel, included many separate engagements, several of which were combined into the Battle of Prokhorovka. The "Battle of Kursk" in addition to describing the initial German offensive operation (or simply an offensive), also included two Soviet counter-offensive operations Operation Kutuzov and Operation Polkovodets Rumyantsev.
 Strike – single attack, upon a specified target. This often forms part of a broader engagement. Strikes have an explicit goal, such as, rendering facilities inoperable (e.g. airports), to assassinating enemy leaders, or to limit supply to enemy troops.

Military strategy 

 Attrition warfare
 Battlespace
 Military deception
 Naval strategy
 Offensive (military)
 Strategic defence
 Strategic goal (military)

Grand strategy 

 Containment
 Economic warfare
 Military science
 Philosophy of war
 Strategic studies
 Total war

Military tactics

Politics of war 
 Casus belli – Latin expression meaning the justification for acts of war. In theory, present international law allows only three situations as legal cause to go to war: out of self-defense, defense of an ally under a mutual defense pact, or sanctioned by the UN.
 Declaration of war
 Surrender
 Capitulation an agreement in time of war for the surrender to a hostile armed force of a particular body of troops, a town or a territory.
 Strategic surrender – surrender to avoid a last, chaotic round of fighting that would have the characteristics of a rout, allowing the victor to obtain his objective without paying the costs of a last battle.
 Unconditional surrender – surrender without conditions, except for those provided by international law.
 Victory
 Debellatio – when a war ends because of the complete destruction of a belligerent state.
 No quarter – when a victor shows no clemency or mercy and refuses to spare the life of the vanquished when they surrender at discretion. Under the laws of war "... it is especially forbidden ... to declare that no quarter will be given".
 Pyrrhic victory – victory with such a devastating cost that it carries the implication that another such victory will ultimately lead to defeat.
 War effort
 War economy

Philosophy of war 

Philosophy of war – examines war beyond the typical questions of weaponry and strategy, inquiring into such things as the meaning and etiology of war, the relationship between war and human nature, and the ethics of war.

 Militarism – belief that war is not inherently bad but can be a beneficial aspect of society.
 Realism – its core proposition is a skepticism as to whether moral concepts such as justice can be applied to the conduct of international affairs. Proponents of realism believe that moral concepts should never prescribe, nor circumscribe, a state's behaviour. Instead, a state should place an emphasis on state security and self-interest. One form of realism – descriptive realism – proposes that states cannot act morally, while another form – prescriptive realism – argues that the motivating factor for a state is self-interest. Just wars that violate Just Wars principles effectively constitute a branch of realism.
 Revolution and Civil War – Just War Theory states that a just war must have just authority. To the extent that this is interpreted as a legitimate government, this leaves little room for revolutionary war or civil war, in which an illegitimate entity may declare war for reasons that fit the remaining criteria of Just War Theory. This is less of a problem if the "just authority" is widely interpreted as "the will of the people" or similar. Article 3 of the 1949 Geneva Conventions side-steps this issue by stating that if one of the parties to a civil war is a High Contracting Party (in practice, the state recognised by the international community,) both Parties to the conflict are bound "as a minimum, the following [humanitarian] provisions." Article 4 of the Third Geneva Convention also makes clear that the treatment of prisoners of war is binding on both parties even when captured soldiers have an "allegiance to a government or an authority not recognized by the Detaining Power."
Consequentialism – moral theory most frequently summarized in the words "the end justifies the means," which tends to support the just war theory (unless the just war causes less beneficial means to become necessary, which further requires worst actions for self-defense with bad consequences).
 Pacifism – belief that war of any kind is morally unacceptable or pragmatically not worth the cost. Pacifists extend humanitarian concern not just to enemy civilians but also to combatants, especially conscripts. For example, Ben Salmon believed all war to be unjust. He was sentenced to death during World War I (later commuted to 25 years hard labor) for desertion and spreading propaganda.
 Right of self-defence – maintains (based on rational self-interest) that the use of retaliatory force is justified against repressive nations that break the zero aggression principle. In addition, if a free country is itself subject to foreign aggression, it is morally imperative for that nation to defend itself and its citizens by whatever means necessary. Thus, any means to achieve a swift and complete victory over the enemy is imperative. This view is prominently held by Objectivists.

Laws of war 
 Laws of war
 War crimes
 List of war crimes

Prisoners of war

Effects of war 

 Casualties
 Casualty
 Casualty classifications
 KIA – Killed In Action
 DOW – Died Of Wounds
 MIA – Missing In Action
 WIA – Wounded in action
 Assassination
 List of genocides by death toll

War and culture

War-related media

War publications 
 The Art of War
 On War

War films 
 List of war films and TV specials – lists movies and shows by the war depicted in them, the sections arranged chronologically

Persons influential in war 
 List of military writers

Inventors of Military Technology 

Mozi
Archimedes
Wei Boyang
Kallinikos
Roger Bacon
Leonardo da Vinci
Richard Jordan Gatling
Mikhail Kalashnikov
Albert Einstein

During the Classical Period
Listed by date of approximate lifetime

Ancient Egypt

Mentuhotep
Ramesses II
Muwatalli I (Hittite) 
Cleopatra (Greek)

Ancient Near East
Hammurabi
Sargon II
Nebuchadnezzar II
Cyrus the Great
Darius I
Xerxes I

Ancient Greece

 Themistocles
 Leonidas I
 Dionysius I of Syracuse
 Philip II of Macedon 
 Alexander the Great
 Diadochi
 Pyrrhus of Epirus

Ancient India
 Porus
 Ashoka
 Chandragupta

Ancient China and its enemies

 Sun Tzu
 Lian Po
 Bai Qi
 Li Mu
 Qin Shi Huang
Wang Jin
 Modu Chanyu
 Huo Qubing
 Wei Qing
 Trung Sisters

Ancient Rome and its enemies
 Mithridates VI of Pontus
 Scipio Africanus
 Hannibal
 Gaius Marius
 Julius Caesar
 Vercingetorix
 Arminius
 Boudica 
 Decebalus
 Trajan
 Aurelian

Late Antiquity
 Constantine
 Flavius Aetius
 Atilla
 Clovis I
 Shapur I
 Khosrow I
 Belisarius
 Bahram Chobin
 Shahin and Shahrbaraz
 Heraclius
 Khalid ibn al-Walid

During the Post-classical Period

Early Middle Ages

 Charlemagne
 Ivar the Boneless
 Alfred the Great
 Cnut the Great
 Basil the Bulgar Slayer
 William the Conqueror

High Middle Ages
 Frederick Barbarossa
 Henry II of England
 Richard the Lionheart
 Philip II of France
 Alexander Nevsky
 El Cid

Islamic Golden Age
Tariq ibn Ziyad
Mahmud of Ghazni
Alp Arslan
Saladin
Baibars

Medieval India 

Rajadhiraja Chola
Prithviraj Chauhan

Medieval China 

Li Shimin
An Lushan
Zhao Kuangyin
Yelu Dashi
Zhu Yuanzhang
Zheng He

Medieval Southeast Asia 
Jayavarman II
Gajah Mada
Ramathibodi I
Le Loi

Mongol Conquests 
 Genghis Khan
 Ogedei Khan
 Subutai
 Kublai Khan
 Timur

Hundred Years War

 Edward III
 Henry V of England
 Charles VII of France
 Joan of Arc

During the Early Modern Period

Japanese Wars

 Oda Nobunga
 Toyotomi Hideyoshi
 Tokugawa Ieyasu
 Yi Sun shin (Korean)

Islamic Empires
 Mehmed the Conqueror
 Suleiman the Magnificent
 Nader Shah
 Akbar

European Colonization of the Americas
Hernán Cortés
Cuauhtémoc
Francisco Pizarro
Powhaten
Pontiac
Tecumseh 
Sitting Bull

Early Modern Europe
Gustavus Adolphus of Sweden
Oliver Cromwell
Peter the Great
Frederick I of Prussia
James Wolfe
Louis-Joseph de Montcalm

Chinese Qing dynasty 

 Wu Sangui
 Kangxi Emperor
 Koxinga
 Ching Shih
 Hong Xiuquan

American Revolutionary War 
 George Washington
 Horatio Gates
 Benedict Arnold
 Marquis de Lafayette
 Charles Cornwallis, 1st Marquess Cornwallis

Napoleonic Wars 
 Horatio Nelson
 Napoleon
 Arthur Wellesley
 Mikhail Kutuzov
 Gebhard Leberecht von Blücher
 Andrew Jackson (War of 1812)

Modern Period

American Civil War 

 Ulysses S Grant 
 Stonewall Jackson
 Robert E Lee
 George Mcclellan
 William Tecumseh Sherman

During World War I 
 Douglas Haig
 Ferdinand Foch
 Louis F. d'Esperey
 John J. Pershing
 Joseph Joffre
 Paul von Hindenburg 
 Erich Ludendorff 
 Erich von Falkenhayn
 August von Mackensen

During World War II 
This is divided between political Leaders, field commanders and other influential people

Political Leaders 

 Winston Churchill
 Adolf Hitler
 Benito Mussolini
 Franklin Roosevelt
 Chiang Kai Sheck
 Joseph Stalin
 Hideki Tojo
 Harry S. Truman

Commanders 
 Harold Alexander, 1st Earl Alexander of Tunis
 Omar Bradley
 Zhu De
 Dwight D. Eisenhower
 Charles de Gaulle
 Hermann Göring
 Heinrich Himmler
 Douglas MacArthur
 Ioannis Metaxas
 Bernard Montgomery, 1st Viscount Montgomery of Alamein
 George S. Patton
 Erwin Rommel
 Hajime Sugiyama
 Josip Broz Tito
 Isoroku Yamamoto
 Mao Zedong
 Georgy Zhukov

Others
 Richard Sorge, Russian spy
 Sofia Vembo

See also

War

Wars

References 

 Charles Phillips and Alan Axelrod: Encyclopedia of Wars. Facts On File, Inc., 2005, . (With about 1,800 wars, this is probably the most complete overview in English language).
 R. Ernest Dupuy, Trevor N. Dupuy: The Harper Encyclopedia of Military History. From 3500 B.C. to the Present. 4th Edition, HarperCollins Publishers, 1993, . (With about 1,300 wars this is probably the second most complete overview in English language, with the added value to summarize about 4,500 battles).
 Vittorio Ferretti: Weltchronik der Kriege und Demozide - Ein Abriss der Ursachen, Abläufe und Folgen von über 5.000 gewalttätig ausgetragenen Konflikten bis zum Jahr 2000. Amazon, 2014, . (With over 5,000 conflicts, this German book is by far the most complete overview published in any language until now. Its added value is to include democides into its scope).

External links

World History Database Listing of all wars
Newspaper by Martin John Callanan translated into different languages listing all wars
Correlates of War Project
Stanford Encyclopedia of Philosophy entry
Complex Emergency Database (CE-DAT) – A database on the human impact of conflicts and other complex emergencies.
World War I primary source collection
International humanitarian law – International Committee of the Red Cross website
International humanitarian law database – Treaties and States Parties
Customary IHL Database

War
War